Beccarianthus is a genus of flowering plants belonging to the family Melastomataceae.

Its native range is Borneo to Philippines, New Guinea.

Species:

Beccarianthus acutifolius 
Beccarianthus ickisii 
Beccarianthus insignis 
Beccarianthus octodontus 
Beccarianthus puberulus 
Beccarianthus pulcher 
Beccarianthus pulcherrimus 
Beccarianthus robustus 
Beccarianthus rufolanatus

References

Melastomataceae
Melastomataceae genera
Taxa named by Alfred Cogniaux